Ballinatate is a townland of  in County Armagh, Northern Ireland. It is in the civil parish of Ballymyre and the historic barony of Fews Upper.

See also
List of townlands in County Armagh

References

Townlands of County Armagh
Civil parish of Ballymyre